Tarand-e Bala Rural District is in Jalilabad District of Pishva County, Tehran province, Iran. At the National Census of 2006, its constituent villages were in the former Pishva District of Varamin County. There were 6,609 inhabitants in 1,663 households at the following census of 2011, by which time the district had been separated from the county and Pishva County established. At the most recent census of 2016, the population of the rural district was 6,030 in 1,644 households. The largest of its 17 villages was Tarand-e Bala, with 1,283 people.

References 

Pishva County

Rural Districts of Tehran Province

Populated places in Tehran Province

Populated places in Pishva County